Ridge coral may refer to several different taxa:

 Catalaphyllia jardinei, a species of coral in the family Euphylliidae
 Euphyllia ancora, a species of coral in the family Euphylliidae
  species of the genus Turbinaria (coral)